Atsushi Kobayashi (小林 敦, born February 24, 1986) is a Japanese former professional baseball pitcher in Nippon Professional Baseball. He played for the Chiba Lotte Marines in 2011.

External links

1986 births
Living people
Baseball people from Shizuoka Prefecture
Japanese baseball players
Nippon Professional Baseball pitchers
Chiba Lotte Marines players
Asian Games medalists in baseball
Baseball players at the 2010 Asian Games
Medalists at the 2010 Asian Games
Asian Games bronze medalists for Japan